Talğar District is a district of Almaty Region in Kazakhstan. The administrative center of the district is the town of Talǵar.
It consists of an alluvial apron formed by the Talgar River, extending northwards from the glacier peaks of the Trans-Ili Alatau (topped by Talgar Peak, 4,973 m), an extension of the northern flanks of the Tien Shan Mountains. Population:

List of settlements
 Beskainar

References

Districts of Kazakhstan
Almaty Region